Dancing Stage Fusion is a music video game released by Konami for the European PlayStation and PlayStation 2 on 5 November 2004. In April of the following year, Dancing Stage Fusion was released as an arcade game. The arcade version of Dancing Stage Fusion was the first arcade machine in Europe since Dancing Stage EuroMix 2 and set a milestone as the first Dance Dance Revolution arcade machine produced by Konami since Dance Dance Revolution Extreme in 2002. The arcade release marked a total game engine upgrade from the old PlayStation-based boards to a new system built on top of an off-the-shelf PlayStation 2.

Gameplay
Dancing Stage Fusion features EyeToy support for the PlayStation 2 release as well as new music from artists like The Darkness, The Sugababes and others. There is an option to use two dance mats at the same time, or against each another in versus mode, with eight levels of difficulty.

The main mode is the Game Mode, where one or two players compete for points over three songs. Each player can choose a different difficulty, with substantial number of tweaks and settings that can be applied to make the game more or less difficult. Besides Game Mode, a Workout mode is also included, which is targeted towards fitness or workout, as well as an Endless Mode which allows the players to dance continuously.

Music
The arcade release of Dancing Stage Fusion consists of 49 songs, while the PlayStation 2 version consists of more than 50 songs, replacing five arcade licenses with ten console-only licenses.

See also
Dance Dance Revolution Extreme
DDR Festival Dance Dance Revolution

References

External links

2004 video games
Arcade video games
Dance Dance Revolution games
Europe-exclusive video games
EyeToy games
PlayStation (console) games
PlayStation 2 games
Video games developed in Germany
Multiplayer and single-player video games